You Can't Escape Forever is a 1942 American drama film directed by Jo Graham and written by Fred Niblo, Jr. and Hector Chevigny. The film stars George Brent, Brenda Marshall, Gene Lockhart, Roscoe Karns, Eduardo Ciannelli and Paul Harvey. The film was released by Warner Bros. on October 10, 1942.

Plot

Cast 
George Brent as Steve Mitchell
Brenda Marshall as Laurie Abbott
Gene Lockhart as Carl Robelink
Roscoe Karns as 'Mac' McTurk
Eduardo Ciannelli as Boss Greer
Paul Harvey as Maj. Turner
Edith Barrett as Madame Lucille

References

External links 
 

1942 films
1940s English-language films
Warner Bros. films
American drama films
1942 drama films
American black-and-white films
Films scored by Adolph Deutsch
Films directed by Jo Graham
1940s American films